The list of ship launches in 1895 includes a chronological list of some ships launched in 1895.


References 

Sources

1895
Ship launches